Willie Reginald Bray (30 April 1879 – 6 June 1939), also known as "The Autograph King", was an English eccentric who first experimented with the limits of the British postal system, including having himself delivered as a letter, and later moved into autograph collecting, amassing over 15,000 autographs by the time of his death.

Biography
Bray was born in Forest Hill, London on 30 April 1879. He lived there until 1938 when he moved to Croydon. He died on 6 June 1939.

References

Further reading

External links
The Eccentric Englishman, New Yorker magazine book review (2010)

1879 births
1939 deaths
People from Forest Hill, London